Sang-hoon, also spelled Sang-hun, is a Korean masculine given name. It was the ninth-most popular name for baby boys in South Korea in 1960 and 1970. Its meaning depends on the hanja used to write each syllable of the name.

Hanja
There are 35 hanja with the reading "sang" and 12 hanja with the reading "hoon" on the South Korean government's official list of hanja which may be used in given names. Examples of ways this name may be written in hanja include:






People
People with this name include:

Sportspeople
Lee Sang-hun (athlete) (born 1938), South Korean long distance runner
Lee Sang-hoon (baseball) (born 1971), South Korean baseball pitcher
Kim Sang-hoon (born 1973), South Korean football coach and former defender (K League 1)
Han Sang-hun (born 1980), South Korean baseball infielder
Han Sang-hoon (born 1984), South Korean badminton player
Jung Sang-hoon (footballer) (born 1985), South Korean football midfielder (K League 1)
Yu Sang-hun (born 1985), South Korean football goalkeeper (K League 1)
Jeon Sang-hoon (born 1989), South Korean football full back (K League 2)
Ma Sang-hoon (born 1993), South Korean football defender (Thai League 2)
Park Sang-hoon (born 1993), South Korean cyclist

Fictional
 Han Sang-hoon from 2016 television series W (TV series)

Others
Kwak Sang-hoon (1896–1980), South Korean politician, Speaker of the National Assembly of South Korea in 1960
Lee Sang-hoon (general) (born 1958), South Korean general, commandant of the Marine Corps (2015–2017)
Maeng Sang-hoon (born 1960), South Korean actor
Choe Sang-hun (born 1962), South Korean journalist
Jung Sang-hoon (born 1978), South Korean actor

See also
List of Korean given names

References

Korean masculine given names